Pinhâni was founded on 5 April 2004 by two cousins Sinan Kaynakçı and Zeynep Eylül Üçer as a modern rock band in Turkey. Pinhani have released several albums. Pinhani has also made the soundtracks of the Turkish TV Series 'Kavak Yelleri'.

Members

Sinan Kaynakçı
Vocalist, Guitarist, Wind Instruments

He was born on December 25, 1980, in İstanbul, Turkey. He spent his childhood in Florya and Bakırköy. He first got involved with music while attending Cağaloğlu Anatolian High School, later graduating in 1998. In 1995, he took sideflute lessons -the same year, he started playing the guitar. In 1996, he also began taking drum lessons at studio "Hip hop". Between the years 2001–2003, he gave several concerts with "Van Basten" at various venues in Taksim/Beyoğlu. During that time, he also started to write his own song lyrics. He broke up with the group that he was performing with, owing to different aims. At the end of 2004, he had a once-in-a-lifetime opportunity to get up close and personal with Akın Eldes whom he had been listening to for years as a strong fan. During the year 2005, he started recording his first album, İnandıgım Masallar. On both of Pinhani's albums, he played an important role as a vocalist and songwriter as he is the one who writes the lyrics and composes the songs. In concert, he enriches his contribution to the band by playing other instruments. In addition to these, he also plays the bass guitar for Akın Eldes's trio from time to time. His talent is not limited to that, he can play the drums, wired, wind instruments and also makes an effort to still play other instruments as well.

Akın Eldes
Guitarist

He was born in Frankfurt, Germany. Like the other group members, his first involvement in music started when he began playing mandolin and flute. His parents were worried that he may be attracted to ideas of revolting against authority. As a result, it was not until he was 16–17 years old and in high school old that he started playing the guitar. After performing with groups "e-5, Painted Bird, Asım Can Gündüz and Çapkınlar between the years of 1986–2000, he joined the group Bulutsuzluk Özlemi. Among other things, he played live with some of the other groups on stage at concerts and during recording. He recorded three different albums that show his own respect for music and his vivid visual sense that inform us about most of his work. Nowadays, he has been working with Pinhani as a musical producer and guitarist and he has taken part in all live performances with the group for a long time.

Zeynep Eylül Üçer
Bass Guitarist, Keyboard

She was born on September 16, 1985, in İstanbul, Turkey. She spent her childhood in Teşvikiye. Between 1991 and 1997, she was a member of the TRT children's chorus. After attending primary school for a year, she moved to Antalya with her family. She played basketball in the second league for a long time. What activated her interest in music was when she received a guitar given by her cousin, Sinan Kaynakçı, as a present. Her mother is a music teacher and she gave Zeynep solfej and Armani lessons. She used to come to Istanbul from time to time to visit while she was living in Antalya, but in 2005, she moved back to Istanbul permanently. She is currently studying at Istanbul Technical University Conservatoire.

Hami Ünlü
Drums

He was born on May 12, 1985. After his high school education in Notre Dame de Sion, he went to Galatasaray University to study economy where he is studying to this day. His music life got started when he joined a drum club in 2000. He received music lessons which gave him the opportunity to meet some well known teachers like Hakan Açıkalın, Bülent Akbay, Alişan Topaloşlu and Berke Özgümüş. He was interested in jazz and drums when he was in high school. He attended some workshops with his teacher Phillipe Poussard who is a teacher at the University of Paris Conservatoire. He became a member of Pinhani in 2006. He also performs in Akın Eldes's trio from time to time.

Selim Aydın
Guitars, Keyboard

He was born on May 16, 1981. He spent his childhood in Adana. The first step he made towards his professional music life was when he began taking classical guitar lessons in primary school. While he was in high school, he performed in concerts and competitions with his group. He met Sinan Kaynakçı when he was at university and he became a member of Van Basten with him. He studied armoni with Cem Nasuhoğlu. Initially, he was unable to play with Pinhani during the recording of their first album as he was abroad. Then he was performing his military service when the group went on an Anatolian tour. But now, since their debut, he has been working with Pinhani.

Cem Aksel
Drums

He was born on February 17, 1963, in Ankara. His interest in jazz and drums had become noticeable when he was in primary school in İstanbul. When he finished high school, he became a professional musician. In 1983, he attended the Swiss Jazz school which was in Swiss Bern, he was unable to continue his studies there due to circumstantial reasons. From that day on, the artist who has been making his living with music played on more than 60 albums with several different singers and artists. He has worked with almost all of the jazz artists in Turkey. Currently, Cem Aksel has been giving performances with Bülent Ortaçgil and many other jazz artists in different places. Cem Aksel performed on both of Pinhani's first and second albums as a drummer. He still plays live with Pinhani at their concert performances from time to time.

Eray Polat 
Guitars

He was born on 19 January 1991 in Istanbul, Turkey. His family moved to Fethiye, Turkey, and he lived there until the age of 18. In primary school, he started his musical life by taking baglama lessons; started playing the guitar when he was 17. He has been playing with Pinhani since 2014.

Albums

İnandığın Masallar (2006)
 İstanbul'da
 Unutuldular
 Haftanin Sonu
 Ben Nası Büyük Adam Olucam
 Beni Al
 Dön Bak Dünyaya
 Seni Bana Anlatırlar
 Hele Bi Gel
 Gözler Anlatır
 Yıldızlar

Zaman Beklemez (2008)
 Zaman Beklemez
 Düğün
 Ağlama
 Ne Güzel Güldün
 Dursana Dünya
 Sırası Değil
 Yansın
 Bir Anda
 Yanlızlık
 Düğün Dernek
 Sevmekten Usanmam

Başka Şeyler (2012)
 Bana Hediye
 Yitirmeden
 Beni Unutur Musun?
 Kaçsam Gitsem
 Çok Aşık
 Değirmendeki
 Hiç Kimseyim
 Kendime Zararım
 Düşen Yaprağın İçinde
 Eylül
 Kapı Parası
 Günaydın Sevgilim

Canlı Yayın (Live) (2013)
Bir Varmışım Bir Yokmuşum
Gönül Dağı
Şairin Elinde
Beni Al
Bir Damla Gözlerimde
Sevduğum Yanımda Uyusun
Hele Bi Gel
Ya Sen Olmasaydın
Uçtu Uçtu
Ağlama
Bir Elmanın Yarısı

Kediköy (2016) 
 Nehirler Durmaz
 Sen Olmayınca
 Geri Dönemem
 Köprü Ortasında
 Beni Sen İnandır
 Dur Söyleme
 Zor Günler
 Düşmanmışız Gibi
 Koluma Yazdım İsmini
 Oyalan
 Benim Yüzümden
 Kurtar
 Dur Söyleme (Tekli Versiyon)

On Türkü (2018)

Yollar Bizi Bekler (2019) 
 Bana El Salla
 Gör Beni
 Kendinden Usandırma
 Kefen Giydim
 Sana Bir Şey Olursa
 Sevmek Güzeldir
 İyi Değilim Ben
 Neden Ben Anlamam
 Peki Madem
 Derdim Dostum Benim
 Senden Hatıra Kaldı
 Kendinden Usandırma - Kemençe Versiyon

Konserdeyim (Live) (2019 & 2020)

Singles
 Yitirmeden (2011)
 Değirmendeki (2011)
 Eylül (2011)
 Dur Söyleme (2014)
 Düşmanmışız Gibi (2015)
 Kendinden Usandırma (2018)
 Peki Madem (with Melis Danişmend, 2018)
 Çekirdekten (with Cihan Mürtezaoğlu, 2019)
 Üzülmeyelim (2019)
 Hikayeler Tükendi (2020)
 Ankara Gel Dedi (2020)
 Dünyadan Uzak (2020)
 Çok Alıştım Sana (2020)
 Beni Böyle Sevemezsin (2020)
 Aşk Bir Mevsim (2020)
 Ben de Delirdim (2020)

Music videos
 İstanbul'da
 Hele Bi Gel
 Ben Nası Büyük Adam Olucam
 Ağlama
 Dursana Dünya
 Ne Güzel Güldün
 Düğün Dernek
 Zaman Beklemez
 Sevmekten Usanmam
 Yitirmeden
 Bana Hediye
 Gönül Dağı
 Bir Varmışım Bir Yokmuşum
 Uçtu Uçtu
 Dur Söyleme
 Düşmanmışız Gibi
 Unutuldular
 Geri Dönemem
 Beni Sen İnandır
 Ben de Delirdim
 Dön Bak Dünyaya
 Bilir O Beni

References

External links
 Official Pinhani website

Musical groups established in 2004
Turkish alternative rock groups